Jake Anderson (born 1980) is an American fishing captain.

Jake Anderson may also refer to:

Other people
Jake Anderson (basketball) (born 1987), American professional basketball player
Jake Anderson (rapper) (born 1984), American rapper known as Prof
Jake Anderson (rugby union) (born 1992), American rugby union player
Jake Anderson, former member of Carnifex (band)

Fictional characters
Jake Anderson, fictional character in Must Love Dogs
Jake Anderson, fictional character in Heartland (Canadian TV series)

See also
Jacob Anderson (disambiguation)